San José is a district of the San Isidro canton, in the Heredia province of Costa Rica.

Geography 
San José has an area of  km² and an elevation of  metres.

Demographics 

For the 2011 census, San José had a population of  inhabitants.

Transportation

Road transportation 
The district is covered by the following road routes:
 National Route 32
 National Route 112

References 

Districts of Heredia Province
Populated places in Heredia Province